Magi: The Labyrinth of Magic is a Japanese anime series based on the manga series of the same title written and illustrated by Shinobu Ohtaka. Produced by A-1 Pictures, it began airing in Japan on October 7, 2012. It also debuted in North America on October 10 on Crunchyroll and Hulu. It is licensed by Aniplex of America in North America, by Viz Media Europe in Europe and by Madman Entertainment in Australia. From episodes 1-12, the opening theme song is "V.I.P." by SID and the ending theme song is "Yubi Bōenkyō" by Nogizaka46. From episode 13 onwards, the opening song is "Matataku Hoshi no Shita de" by Porno Graffitti and the ending is "The Bravery" by Supercell.

A second season, Magi: The Kingdom of Magic began airing on October 6, 2013. For the first part, the opening theme song is "Anniversary" by SID and the ending theme song is "Eden" by Aqua Timez, while for the second part, the opening theme song is "Hikari" by ViViD and the ending theme song is "With You/With Me" by 9nine. 


Series overview

Episode list
Just like the manga, all episodes of Magi are labeled "Nights" in an allusion to the tales of the One Thousand and One Nights which served as a primary inspiration to the story.

Magi: The Labyrinth of Magic (2012–13)

Magi: The Kingdom of Magic (2013–14)

See also
 List of Magi: The Labyrinth of Magic characters

References

Magi: The Labyrinth of Magic